The Bad Man: Rare & Unreissued Ike Turner Produced Recordings 1962–1965 is a collection of singles produced by musician Ike Turner. The album was released by Night Train International in 2004.

Content 
In the early '60s, the Ike & Tina Turner Revue performed rigorously on the Chitlin' Circuit and built a reputation as "one of the most potent live acts on the R&B circuit." To assure he always had a record out while on tour, Ike Turner formed multiple labels: Teena (named after his wife Tina Turner), Prann, Innis, Sony, and Sonja Records. He released a handful of singles from vocalist within the Revue such as Robbie Montgomery, Vernon Guy, and Jimmy Thomas, and he recorded other artists including Fontella Bass and George Jackson.

A few of the recordings on The Bad Man charted upon their release. "No Bail In This Jail (Prisoner In Love)" by the Ikettes reached No. 126 on Bubbling Under The Hot 100 in 1963. "So Fine" by Ike & Tina and the Ikettes reached No. 50 on the Billboard R&B Singles chart and No. 117 on Bubbling Under The Hot 100 in 1968.

Critical reception 

Reviewing The Bad Man for AllMusic, Tim Sendra wrote:None of the labels (Innis, Prann, Sonja, Sony, or Teena) amounted to much commercially, but quite a few of the sides on this disc stack up well against the hits Ike & Tina were having at the time for Sue. All of them have the quick and nasty sound that Ike always favors. Fidelity and a crisp clean sound were never priorities for Turner; instead, he wanted excitement and sweat, and that is what he usually got. The most successful and fully realized songs on The Bad Man feature Tina, as she was the perfect foil for Ike's clattering wall of sound.

Track listing 
All tracks written by Ike Turner, except where indicated.

References 

Ike & Tina Turner compilation albums
Ike Turner albums
2004 compilation albums
Albums produced by Ike Turner